Moorlands College is an Evangelical Christian training college with a campus based in Sopley (near Christchurch) Dorset, and Regional Centres in Devon, and Belfast in Northern Ireland. All degree courses (including undergraduate and postgraduate degrees) are validated by the University of Gloucestershire. The college is non-denominational and acclaims a Statement of Faith which is shared by several Evangelical Christian organisations. The college participates in the Government’s Teaching Excellence Framework (TEF) and received a Silver TEF award in 2018. They are reviewed by the Quality Assurance Agency to ensure they fully meet national expectations as a provider of higher education.

Programmes at Moorlands College
Moorlands College offers various programmes in Applied Theology at undergraduate, postgraduate and short course level. Within the undergraduate offering, students can choose from a variety of specialisms across Cross Cultural Studies, Missional Leadership, Children and Schools Work, Community and Families, and Youth and Community Work studies. The Youth and Community Work course includes a JNC Professional Qualification.

Undergraduate:

 Foundation Year
BA (Hons) in Applied Theology
BA (Hons) in Applied Theology (Youth and Community Work) with JNC Professional Qualification endorsed by the National Youth Agency.

Postgraduate:

MA in Applied Theology (Four Specialist Modules)
Apologetics
Christian Leadership
Chaplaincy
The Bible and Preaching
 MA in Language, Community and Development

Moorlands Centres
Moorlands College has centres in three regions:

- Christchurch Campus
- South West Regional Centre 
- Belfast

References

Bible colleges, seminaries and theological colleges in England
Education in Christchurch, Dorset
Educational institutions established in 1948
1948 establishments in England